Sky Airline, styled as SꓘY, is an airline based at Comodoro Arturo Merino Benítez International Airport in Santiago, Chile. It is the second largest airline in the country behind flag-carrier LATAM Airlines and the first airline to operate under a low-cost model in the country. It serves international routes to Argentina, Brazil, Peru and Uruguay. It also operates charter flights in Chile and South America and domestic flights within Peru.

History

Sky Airline was controlled by its founder, Jürgen Paulmann (1930–2014), a German-Chilean businessman, brother of retail billionaire Horst Paulmann. It started operations in December 2001 and made the first flights from Santiago to Northern Chile in June 2002. Since 2005 is a full member of IATA.

In April 2009, the company signed an agreement with Aerolíneas Argentinas, allowing the Argentinean flag carrier to offer in all its commercial offices and through its electronic ticket system most of the destinations covered by Sky Airline in Chile.

In 2011 it signed a codeshare agreement with TACA for domestic flights in Chile, Peru and between both countries. In 2012 it signed a codeshare agreement with TACA's parent company, Colombia's Avianca for operations between Chile and Colombia.

The airline planned to transition to a low-cost carrier model during 2015 and 2016 to reduce costs.

On October 2, 2021, Sky Airline announced that it will merge with Avianca to create a mega low-cost carrier by 2022.

Awards

Sky Airline was named the Best Regional Airline in South America in the 2014, 2015 and 2016 Skytrax World Airline Awards.

In addition, OAG (Official Airline Guide) declared Sky Airline as the most punctual airline of 2016.

Maintenance

Maintenance services are supplied by AIRMAN, a sister maintenance company based in Santiago Airport.

Destinations

Fleet

Current fleet
The Sky Airline fleet consists of the following aircraft (as of September 2021):

Former fleet
Since its beginnings, Sky Airline operated a 100% Boeing 737 fleet, these began to be replaced by Airbus A320 family planes in 2010 and were fully withdrawn in 2013.

Incidents and accidents

 On July 18, 2012, at 5:08 PM local time, a Sky Airline Flight SKU 101, operated by a Boeing 737-200 Advanced, registration CC-CRQ, with 115 passengers and 6 crew members on board,  en route from Antofagasta Cerro Moreno Airport to La Serena-La Florida Airport, aborted landing at La Serena touching the runway with its right hand wing, suffering substantial damage to the wing tip and flap fairing. The plane safely landed at Copiapó-Chamonate Airport at 5:47 PM with no injuries. Visibility conditions at La Serena were rapidly deteriorating at the time of the approach, but still good enough for a safe landing (6000 m. visibility). The plane was subsequently repaired.
 On October 14, 2015, a passenger on board SKU 112, an Airbus A319, filmed part of the plane's left engine cowling coming off as it took off from Santiago Airport en route to Chamonate Airport.  The plane immediately returned to Santiago Airport and landed safely.  No passengers were injured.  A similar incident with the A319 had happened previously on a British Airways flight departing Heathrow Airport.

References

External links
Official website

Airlines of Chile
Airlines established in 2001
Latin American and Caribbean Air Transport Association
Chilean brands
Low-cost carriers
Chilean companies established in 2001